Hassan Tikkodi is an Indian author from the state of Kerala who writes mainly in vernacular Malayalam.

Tikkodi was a hostage for 14 days in Kuwait when the Iraqi military invaded Kuwait in August 1990 while he boarded in British Airways Flight bound to Madras and Singapore.  He was then released after Iraqi Military has taken all other white skin co-passengers as human shield to Iraq. Though he was released in Kuwait along with other Indian and Asian National he spend few more days in Saddam's proclaimed "19th Provision". Then he decided to move to India with his friends , relatives by driving through Amman's refugee camp but it was very difficult to cross the border and decided to travel via road through Turkey.

Filmography

References

1952 births
Indian Muslims
Malayali people
Malayalam-language writers
Malayalam novelists
Malayalam short story writers
People from Kozhikode district
Living people
Novelists from Kerala
Indian male novelists
Indian male short story writers
20th-century Indian short story writers
20th-century Indian male writers